Music from and Inspired By the Motion Picture Pootie Tang is the soundtrack to Louis C.K.'s 2001 comedy film Pootie Tang. It was released on June 26, 2001 through Hollywood Records and consisted of R&B and hip hop music. The album peaked at #51 on the Top R&B/Hip-Hop Albums and #22 on the Top Soundtracks and featured one charting single "Southern Gul" by Erykah Badu & Rahzel, which made it to #24 on the Hot R&B/Hip-Hop Singles & Tracks.

Track listing

References

External links
 Music From And Inspired By The Motion Picture Pootie Tang at Discogs

2001 soundtrack albums
Comedy film soundtracks
Hip hop soundtracks
Hollywood Records soundtracks